Lethe  violaceopicta,   the  Manipur woodbrown, is a species of Satyrinae butterfly found in the  Indomalayan realm (Tibet, West China (Sichuan, Guizhou), Manipur).

References

violaceopicta
Butterflies of Asia